Québec Identitaire (English: Quebec Identity) is a Quebec based protest group espousing that people that follow  Islam should leave Canada. In November 2014, the group vandalized several mosques in Quebec and left paper leaflets with a written message in Quebec French "Islam hors de chez moi" (English: "Islam out of my country").

These incidents came shortly after two separate attacks by lone wolf terrorists sympathetic to the group Islamic State of Iraq and the Levant. The attacks, the 2014 Saint-Jean-sur-Richelieu ramming attack and the 2014 shootings at Parliament Hill, Ottawa, led to the deaths of two Canadian Armed Forces personnel.

Response
On November 12, 2014, Quebec Liberal Party Immigration Minister Kathleen Weil stated, "It's important for us as a government to condemn these acts...I had the opportunity to say to some international news reporters that it really doesn't reflect Quebec society.  It reflects terribly on us from the outside.  We are a tolerant society, inclusive and open to diversity."

See also

 Bloc identitaire - Original chapter of Identitaire.
 Génération Identitaire - France chapter of Identitaire.
 Counterjihad
 Criticism of Islam
 Islamophobia in Canada
 Quebec nationalism
 Religious intolerance

References

2014 in Quebec
Canadian far-right political movements
Anti-Islam sentiment in Canada
Organizations based in Quebec
Identitarian movement
Anti-Islam sentiment in Quebec
Quebec nationalism
Violence against Muslims
White nationalism in Canada
Racism in Quebec